The Third Follett Ministry was the fourth ministry of the Government of the Australian Capital Territory, and was led by Labor Chief Minister Rosemary Follett and her deputy, Wayne Berry. It was sworn in on 6 April 1992 following the incumbent Labor minority government winning a plurality of seats in the Australian Capital Territory Legislative Assembly at the 1992 election.

First arrangement
This covers the period from 6 April 1992 (when the Ministry was sworn in) until 13 April 1994 when Wayne Berry stood down as Deputy Chief Mnisiter and was replaced by David Lamont.

Second arrangement
This covers the period from 13 April 1994 until the 1995 ACT general election. There was one minor change during this period when, on 20 May 1994, the arts ministry was expanded to include heritage, with Wood remaining as minister.

References

Australian Capital Territory ministries
Australian Labor Party ministries in the Australian Capital Territory